Rodnichki is a rural locality (a settlement) and the administrative center of Rodnichkovskoye Rural Settlement, Nekhayevsky District, Volgograd Oblast, Russia. The population was 921 as of 2010. There are 13 streets.

Geography 
Rodnichki is located on Kalach Upland, 39 km south of Nekhayevskaya (the district's administrative centre) by road. Kruglovka is the nearest rural locality.

References 

Rural localities in Nekhayevsky District